An SSA impersonation scam, or SSA scam, is a class of telecommunications fraud and scam which targets citizens of the United States by impersonating personnel of the Social Security Administration. SSA scams are typically initiated by pre-recorded messages, or robocalls, which are designed to panic the victim so that they follow the scammer's instructions. In 2018, over 35,000 incidences of SSA scam robocalls were reported to the Better Business Bureau, and the total losses of victims added up to over $10 million. It is believed that approximately 47% of Americans were subject to an SSA impersonation scam robocall during a three-month period in mid- to late 2020, and that 21% of seniors were targeted by at least three SSA scam robocalls in the same time period.

Operation

Initiation

Most Social Security scams that occur start with computer-generated robocalls sent out in large quantities which claim to be from the Social Security Administration, however some have been known to be initiated via email and text messaging. The message claims that the victim's Social Security number (SSN) has been or is going to be suspended, for reasons which include money laundering, drug dealing and fraud, which are claimed to have been found to be linked to the victim's SSN. In variations of the scam, the call may even claim that the recipient's bank account is at risk and action must be taken to stop the immediate freezing or seizure of money from the account, that failure to comply with the call's instructions will result in the cancellation of government benefits, or that legal action is about to be taken against the recipient. After this, the call demands that the recipient call a "helpline" so they can learn more about the case. Most calls use social engineering in order to make potential victims panic and call them. Caller ID spoofing is often employed by the scammers, who sometimes send out their robocalls in a way so they appear to come from legitimate SSA phone numbers, to boost the credibility of the robocall.

Persuasion
Once a victim calls the fictitious helpline, scammers based in call centers attempt to persuade them further, making the victim believe the legitimacy of the call, usually with help of a pre-written script. A particularly common script alleges that the victim's social security number was used to rent a car in Texas, which was later discovered abandoned and containing blood and drugs by law enforcement near the Mexico–United States border. The scammers sometimes use the real names and badge numbers of SSA employees and spoof their phone numbers in order to legitimize the robocall. It has been suggested that scammers have taken advantage of data breaches in order to persuade the victim that they are speaking to a legitimate government employee, by information gained from data breaches back to the victim. During this phase, scammers also aim to gain as much of the victim's personal information as possible, such as their name, a partial or full SSN or their date of birth, usually under the guise of "verifying the caller's identity." Victims may also be added to a sucker list if the scam is successful so that they can be targeted with other scams.

Payment
Social Security scammers will request payment from the victims through untraceable routes, which are mainly through gift cards, pre-paid debit cards, wire transfer, cryptocurrency, or even packages of cash sent by mail. The payment will undergo money laundering before it is claimed by the social security scammer. As a response to the increased usage of gift cards as untraceable means of payment by scammers, several companies have posted advisories warning about potential fraudulent uses, however it has been reported that victims who have been successfully convinced by scammers often overlook warning signs and proceed to purchase gift cards.

Increase in usage

Since 2017, there has been a rapid increase number of SSA impersonation scam robocalls. In 2017, 3,200 incidents of SSA scam robocalls were reported to the FTC with losses of US$210,000. In comparison, during 2018 over 35,000 incidents of SSA impersonation scam robocalls were reported, with losses totaling to over US$10 million. MSN News stated that in the first three months of 2019, over 65,000 incidents of attempted SSA impersonation scams were reported.

It is believed that SSA impersonation scams are now preferred over IRS impersonation scams by fraudulent call centres, the latter scam undergoing a sharp decline in late 2016.

Losses
According to the Federal Trade Commission, in 2018 over US$10 million were lost in total, with an average loss of US$1,500 per victim. A citizen in Ohio reportedly lost over US$4,000 after falling for an SSA impersonation scam. A retired professor in San Francisco fell victim to the scam and sent $4,000 in gift cards to the scammers, before posting a package consisting of $20,000 via delivery courier FedEx to a money mule working for the same group of scammers. The package, along with another sent by a victim living in Boston, has since been seized by authorities in Fairfax County and returned to their owners. In 2019, US$153 million was lost to scams impersonating government agencies, and according to the Federal Trade Commission, US$37 million of that was attributed to Social Security scams.

See also
 Advance fee fraud
 Confidence trick
 IRS impersonation scam
 Overpayment scam
 Scambaiting
 Technical support scam

References

Confidence tricks
Fraud in the United States